A History of Britain is a three volume work written by Simon Schama to accompany a series of documentaries he presented for the BBC.

The volumes are:
 A History of Britain I: At the Edge of the World? 3000 BC–AD 1603 (BBC, 2000)
 A History of Britain II: The British Wars 1603–1776 (BBC, 2001)
 A History of Britain III: The Fate of Empire 1776–2000 (BBC, 2002)

External links
Official web site
Presentation by Schama on A History of Britain: 3500 B.C. - 1603 A.D., December 5, 2000, C-SPAN

2000 non-fiction books
Books by Simon Schama
English-language books
History books about the United Kingdom